Asavdybash (Asawźıbaş) is a rural locality (a selo) and the administrative centre of Asavdybashsky Selsoviet, Yanaulsky District, Bashkortostan, Russia. The population was 193 as of 2010. There are 3 streets.

Geography 
Asavdybash is located 27 km southeast of Yanaul (the district's administrative centre) by road. Yussukovo is the nearest rural locality.

References 

Rural localities in Yanaulsky District